Seamountiella is a genus of sea snails, marine gastropod mollusks in the family Skeneidae.

Species
 Seamountiella azorica (Dautzenberg & H. Fischer, 1896)
 Seamountiella caledonica Rubio, Gofas & Rolán, 2019
 Seamountiella dimidia Rubio, Gofas & Rolán, 2019
 Seamountiella mayottensis Rubio, Gofas & Rolán, 2019

References

 Rubio, F.; Gofas, S.; Rolán, E. (2019). A new genus of small Vetigastropoda from eastern Atlantic Ocean and Indo-Pacific islands and seamounts. Iberus: Revista de la Sociedad Española de Malacología, (Iberus). 37(2): 249–265.

Skeneidae
Gastropod genera